Mamai (also Mamay; formerly Kirovka) is a town in the Tavush Province of Armenia near the border to Georgia.

References 

Populated places in Tavush Province